Pancreatic polypeptide receptor 1, also known as Neuropeptide Y receptor type 4, is a protein that in humans is encoded by the PPYR1 gene.

Selective Ligands

Agonists
 Pancreatic polypeptide
 Neuropeptide Y (endogenous agonist, non subtype selective)
 Peptide YY
 GR-231,118 (mixed NPY1 antagonist / NPY4 agonist, CAS# 158859-98-4)

Antagonists
 UR-AK49

See also 
 Neuropeptide Y receptor

References

External links

Further reading 

 
 
 
 
 
 
 
 
 
 
 
 
 
 
 
 

G protein-coupled receptors